Sarah Jane Smith was a Big Finish Productions series of audio plays based on Sarah Jane Smith from the television series Doctor Who. Sarah Jane was voiced by the original actor Elisabeth Sladen.

Episodes

Series 1 (2002)

Series 2 (2006)

References

Audio plays based on Doctor Who
Big Finish Productions
Doctor Who spin-offs